Patrick Karnezis (born 23 April 1992) is a former professional Australian rules footballer who played for the  and Collingwood Football Club in the Australian Football League (AFL). He was taken at pick number 25 in the 2010 national draft by the Brisbane Lions. Karnezis made his debut in round 13 of the 2011 season, against . On 25 October 2013 he was traded to the Collingwood Football Club in exchange for Jackson Paine. He retired from AFL at the conclusion of the 2015 season.
After his retirement from AFL, Karnezis joined West Preston Lakeside of the Northern Football League (NFL).

Statistics

|- style="background-color: #EAEAEA"
! scope="row" style="text-align:center" | 2011
|
| 28 || 11 || 17 || 10 || 65 || 23 || 88 || 40 || 14 || 1.5 || 0.9 || 5.9 || 2.1 || 8.0 || 3.6 || 1.3
|-
! scope="row" style="text-align:center" | 2012
|
| 28 || 7 || 7 || 8 || 39 || 18 || 57 || 29 || 14 || 1.0 || 1.1 || 5.6 || 2.6 || 8.1 || 4.1 || 2.0
|- style="background-color: #EAEAEA"
! scope="row" style="text-align:center" | 2013
|
| 28 || 3 || 0 || 4 || 20 || 18 || 38 || 11 || 7 || 0.0 || 1.3 || 6.7 || 6.0 || 12.7 || 3.7 || 2.3
|-
! scope="row" style="text-align:center" | 2014
|
| 33 || 0 || — || — || — || — || — || — || — || — || — || — || — || — || — || —
|- style="background-color: #EAEAEA"
! scope="row" style="text-align:center" | 2015
|
| 33 || 4 || 2 || 0 || 27 || 14 || 41 || 10 || 7 || 0.5 || 0.0 || 6.8 || 3.5 || 10.3 || 2.5 || 1.8
|- class="sortbottom"
! colspan=3| Career
! 25
! 26
! 22
! 151
! 73
! 224
! 90
! 42
! 1.0
! 0.9
! 6.0
! 2.9
! 9.0
! 3.6
! 1.7
|}

References

External links

1992 births
Living people
Brisbane Lions players
Collingwood Football Club players
Australian rules footballers from Melbourne
Oakleigh Chargers players
West Preston Football Club players
Australian people of Greek descent
People educated at Marcellin College, Bulleen